RTCA may refer to:

 Radio Technical Commission for Aeronautics, an organisation that develops aviation standards
 Rio Tinto Coal Australia, an Australian coal mining company
 Radio and Television Correspondents Association, an organization for political reporters in Washington, D.C.